Angraecum implicatum is a species of orchid found in Réunion and Madagascar.

References 

implicatum
Orchids of Réunion
Orchids of Madagascar